The FIBT World Championships 1965 took place in St. Moritz, Switzerland for the record tenth time. The Swiss city had hosted the event previously in 1931 (Four-man), 1935 (Four-man), 1937 (Four-man), 1938 (Two-man), 1939 (Two-man), 1947, 1955, 1957, and 1959.

Two man bobsleigh

Four man bobsleigh

Canada earned its first gold medal at these championships.

Medal table

References
 Les Sports info
2-Man bobsleigh World Champions
4-Man bobsleigh World Champions

1965
1965 in Swiss sport
Sport in St. Moritz
1965 in bobsleigh
International sports competitions hosted by Switzerland
Bobsleigh in Switzerland